Sedrina is a comune (municipality) in the Province of Bergamo in the Italian region of Lombardy, located about  northeast of Milan and about  northwest of Bergamo.

Sedrina borders the following municipalities: Brembilla, Sorisole, Ubiale Clanezzo, Villa d'Almè, Zogno.

Sedrina is the birthplace of Felice Gimondi.

Demographic evolution

References